Violet Madeleine Cobb (née Weston, born 3 July 1940) is a British sprinter. She competed in the women's 100 metres at the 1964 Summer Olympics.

She also represented England and won a gold medal in the 4 x 110 Yard Relay and a bronze medal in the 100 yards at the 1958 British Empire and Commonwealth Games in Cardiff, Wales. Twelve years later (aged 30) she represented England again and won a silver medal in the 4 x 100 metres relay, at the 1970 British Commonwealth Games in Edinburgh, Scotland.

References

1940 births
Living people
Athletes (track and field) at the 1964 Summer Olympics
British female sprinters
Olympic athletes of Great Britain
Athletes (track and field) at the 1958 British Empire and Commonwealth Games
Athletes (track and field) at the 1970 British Commonwealth Games
Commonwealth Games medallists in athletics
Commonwealth Games gold medallists for England
Commonwealth Games silver medallists for England
Commonwealth Games bronze medallists for England
Athletes from London
Olympic female sprinters
Medallists at the 1958 British Empire and Commonwealth Games
Medallists at the 1970 British Commonwealth Games